Georgy Petrovich Zozulya (5 February 1920 – 5 January 1954) was a ground-attack pilot in the Soviet Air Force during World War II.

Awards
 Hero of the Soviet Union (15 May 1946)
 Order of Lenin (15 May 1946)
 Order of the Red Banner (20 September 1944)
 Order of the Patriotic War 1st Class (19 December 1944)
 Order of the Red Star (15 May 1944)
 campaign medals

References

1920 births
1954 deaths
Recipients of the Order of Lenin
Recipients of the Order of the Red Banner
Heroes of the Soviet Union
Soviet Air Force officers